Esmeralda is a 1915 silent film starring Mary Pickford, directed by James Kirkwood, and produced by Adolph Zukor and stage impresario Daniel Frohman.

As with the previous Pickford vehicles -- Caprice, Mistress Nell and The Dawn of a Tomorrow -- Esmeralda is based on a short story and stage play Esmeralda written by Frances Hodgson Burnett and William Gillette and produced in the 1880s. The play was acted by Annie Russell and later Viola Allen both teenagers at the time, who later became well known adult theater actresses.

Cast
Mary Pickford - Esmeralda Rogers
Ida Waterman - Esmeralda's mother
Fuller Mellish - Esmeralda's father
Arthur Hoops - Count de Montessin
William Buckley - William Estabrook
Charles Waldron - David Hardy

Plot
Esmeralda is a new kind of Mary Pickford picture. The story begins on the farm and swings around to the big city. From the simple and wholesome country girl "Esmeralda" becomes a veteran society leader. One of the big features of "Esmeralda" is the interrupted wedding ceremony in which Little Mary refuses to marry the count. It is a real Pickford scene and worth as much as many entire pictures."

Preservation status
This film is now considered a lost film.

See also
List of lost films

References

External links

1915 films
American silent feature films
American films based on plays
Lost American films
Films directed by James Kirkwood Sr.
1915 drama films
Silent American drama films
American black-and-white films
1915 lost films
Lost drama films
1910s American films
English-language drama films